Major League Baseball tie-breaking procedures are used by Major League Baseball (MLB) to break ties between teams for qualification and seeding into the MLB postseason. The procedures in use since , when a third wild card team and resulting Wild Card Series were added for both the American League and National League, are outlined below.

Ties between two teams

Two-way tie for the division or wild-card
One-game tiebreakers were played between teams tied for a division championship or a league's second wild-card berth. These games were played the day after the season was scheduled to end. Home-field advantage was determined using the rules listed below ("Breaking Ties Without Playoff Games"). 

From the implementation of the wild-card in 1994 to the end of the 2011 season, a different rule was in place. Two teams tied for a division did not play a tiebreaker if their records were better than all non-division winners in their league. Instead, said tie was broken using the rules listed below ("Breaking Ties Without Playoff Games"). This scenario happened in the 2001 when the Houston Astros and St. Louis Cardinals tied for first in the National League Central with 93–69, in 2005, the New York Yankees and Boston Red Sox each finished 95–67 in the American League East, and in 2006, the San Diego Padres and Los Angeles Dodgers finished tied with 88–74 in the National League West. The team that had the better head-to-head record the 2001 Astros, 2005 Yankees, and 2006 Padres) was the division champion, thus receiving a better seed in the postseason. The other team (the 2001 Cardinals, 2005 Red Sox, and 2006 Dodgers) was seeded as the wild card.

From 2012 to 2021, when a second wild-card berth was adopted, thus requiring the establishment of the Wild Card Game, the non-division winner with the best record in the league faced possible elimination on the first day of the postseason. Consequently, the tie-breaking rules were changed so that two teams tied for a division championship had to play a tiebreaking game even if both teams had already qualified for the postseason. The team losing the tie-breaking game qualified for a wild-card berth only if its regular-season record was among the league's two best records for non-division-winners. If that team were tied for the second wild-card spot, a second tie-breaking game would have been played.

If, on the other hand, two teams had been tied for the first wild-card spot, no tie-breaking game would have been played. Rather, the two teams simply played against each other in the Wild Card game, with home-field advantage awarded using tie-breaking rules described in the next section.

Beginning with the 2022 season, a third wild-card berth per league was adopted. Thus, the tiebreaker game format was eliminated, to compensate for the expanded (12-team) postseason.

Breaking ties without playoff games
Coin tosses or drawing of lots will be used if all criteria below fail. 
The team with the better head-to-head winning percentage during the regular season.
The team with the best overall record in intradivision games.*
The team with the best overall record in intraleague games.
The team with the best record in the final 81 intraleague games of the season.
The team with the best record in the final 82 intraleague games of the season (provided the game added is not between the tied teams), continue one game back until the tie is broken (Interleague games are skipped and ignored in this process.)

*all current references in mlb.com website indicate that this rule applies even for teams that are not in the same division.

Ties between two division winners
If two champions from separate divisions have the same record, the tiebreaking procedure listed above is used to determine postseason seeding. No additional games are played.

Ties among multiple teams

Playoff games for multiple-way ties
Tied teams are designated as A, B, C, and D. Choice for one of these designations is first given to the team winning the tie-breakers (listed below). While A is usually the "best" designation, there are some scenarios where C has a different path to the postseason. If a division title is up for grabs, then those divisional teams will select from the first designations (A, B,...).

On Day 1, A will host B and C will host D (if there is no fourth team, C will be considered to have won this game). Games on Day 2 may occur as follows:

 If the teams are all competing for 1 playoff spot, then the A/B winner will host the C/D winner for that spot.
 If 3 teams, not all tied for the same division lead, are competing for 2 playoff spots, C will host the A/B loser for the second spot.
 If 4 teams were competing for 3 playoff spots, and two teams are competing for the division championship, then the A/B loser will play the C/D loser for the final wild-card spot. Home field will be determined by the rules for two way tiebreakers.
 If 4 teams were competing for 3 playoff spots, and three teams are competing for the division championship, if D wins, then the A/B winner wins the division and Club D is a wild card, with the A/B loser then hosting C for the other wild card. If D loses, then the A/B winner hosts team C for the division, and the loser is a wild card, and the A/B loser hosts team D for the other wild card.
 If 3 or 4 teams, tied for the same division's lead, both win on Day 1, then the A/B winner will host the C/D winner to determine the division title. The loser of this Day 2 game will earn a wild card spot. If four teams are competing for three spots, the A/B loser hosts the C/D loser for the a wild card.

Determining team designations
The order in which teams pick their designations (A, B, C, D) will be determined by the following 5-step tie-breaking system. If there is a tie for both wild card and division title spots, then the first designations will match teams competing for their division title.

 Winning/Losing season series against each of the other tied teams (only if a 3 way tie)
 Winning percentage among all tied teams
 Winning percentage in intradivision games
 Winning percentage in the last half of intraleague play
 If still tied, the next most recent intraleague game is added into this winning percentage (skipping games between tied teams) until not all teams are tied.

If at any given step some, but not all, teams remain tied, then those teams that are still tied revert to Step 1.

See also
 List of Major League Baseball tie-breakers

Sources

References

External links
 2015 MLB tiebreaker rules from MLB.com
 2014 MLB tiebreaker rules from MLB.com
 2013 MLB tiebreaker rules from MLB.com
 2012 MLB tiebreaker rules from the Internet Archive Wayback Machine (archived from MLB.com)

Major League Baseball rules